Gambarana is a comune (municipality) in the Province of Pavia in the Italian region Lombardy, located about 60 km southwest of Milan and about 35 km southwest of Pavia. As of 31 December 2021, it had a population of 199 and an area of 12.0 km².

Gambarana borders the following municipalities: Bassignana, Frascarolo, Isola Sant'Antonio, Mede, Pieve del Cairo, Suardi.

Demographic evolution

References

Cities and towns in Lombardy